Nasrallah ibn Muhammad ibn Abd al-Hamid Shirazi, better known as Abu'l-Ma'ali Nasrallah (ابوالمعالی نصرالله), was a Persian poet and statesman who served as the vizier of the Ghaznavid Sultan Khusrau Malik.

Biography 
Nasrallah was born in Ghazni; he was the grandson of Abd al-Hamid Shirazi, a prominent Ghaznavid vizier, who himself was the son of the prominent Ghaznavid vizier Ahmad Shirazi, who was the son of Abu Tahir Shirazi, a secretary under the Samanids, whose family was originally from Shiraz in southern Iran. Nasrallah later became a secretary at the Ghaznavid court, and also became a poet. Between 1143 and 1146, Nasrallah translated the Arabic translated Indian fable story Kalila wa Dimna to Persian, and dedicated it to Sultan Bahram-Shah.

During the reign of the Bahram-Shah's grandson, the last Ghaznavid Sultan Khusrau Malik, Nasrallah was appointed as his vizier, but later fell into disfavor and was imprisoned, and then executed.

References

Sources 
 
 
 

12th-century deaths
12th-century births
12th-century Iranian people
Ghaznavid viziers
Ghaznavid-period poets